RCR Tomlinson is a failed Australian multi-disciplined engineering company.

History
In 1898, Tomlinson Bros was founded as an engineering company in Perth by Ernest and Edward Tomlinson. In 1951 the company was floated.

In 1981, Clyde Engineering that already held a 63% shareholding, launched a successful takeover bid. In 1985 with a lack of work, Clyde proposed to close the business, however it was rescued in a management buyout. In December 1996 RCR Tomlinson was formed when RCR Engineering and Tomlinson Bros merged.

In the 2000s, it diversified into solar power projects.

In November 2018, RCR Tomlinson was placed in voluntary administration. The collapse came just three months after it had received a $100 million capital injection. In December 2018, the O'Donnell Griffin rail business was sold to John Holland.

It appears the Company was trading insolvent for many months before the collapse and investigations into the Directors are ongoing.

References

Companies based in Sydney
Companies formerly listed on the Australian Securities Exchange
Construction and civil engineering companies established in 1898
Engineering companies of Australia
Defunct rolling stock manufacturers of Australia
Solar energy companies
1898 establishments in Australia